Përmet is a city and municipality in Gjirokastër County, southern Albania. The municipality of Përmet consists of the administrative units of Çarçovë, Frashër, Petran, Qendër Piskovë and Përmet. The total population is 10,614 (2011 census), in a total area of 602.47 km2. The population of the former municipality at the 2011 census was 5,945. It is flanked by the Vjosë river, which runs along the Trebeshinë-Dhëmbel-Nemërçkë mountain chain, between Trebeshinë and Dhëmbel mountains, and through the Këlcyrë Gorge.

Name 

The town itself is known in Albanian as Përmet, and  when in definite form.

History

14th century 

In 14th century Përmet came under Ottoman rule and became first a kaza of the sanjak of Gjirokastër and later of the Sanjak of Ioannina.

18th century 

During the era of conversions to Islam in the 18th century, Christian Albanian speaking areas such as the region of Rrëzë strongly resisted those efforts, in particular the village of Hormovë and the town of Përmet.

In 1778, a Greek school was established and financed by the local Orthodox Church and the diaspora of the town.

19th century 

After a successful revolt in 1833 the Ottoman Empire replaced Ottoman officials in the town with local Albanian ones and proclaimed a general amnesty for all those who had been involved in the uprising. The artisans of the kaza of Përmet held the monopoly in the trade of opinga in the vilayets of Shkodër and Janina until 1841, when that privilege was revoked under the Tanzimat reforms. In 1882 Greek education was expanded with the foundation of a Greek girls' school subsidized by members of the local diaspora that lived in Constantinople, as well as the Greek national benefactor, Konstantinos Zappas. The first Albanian-language school of the town was founded in the beginning of 1890 by Llukë Papavrami, a teacher from Hotovë, who had the endorsement of Naim Frasheri. A great contribution for the Albanian school was given by philanthropists Mihal Kerbici, Pano Duro and Stathaq Duka. Duro and Kerbici financed until 1896 the salaries of five teachers, whereas Stathaq Duka bequeathed in 1886 scholarships for studies in the schools of Jurisprudence and Medicine. In 1909 during the Second Constitutional Era the authorities allowed Albanian language to be taught in the local madrasah. It was a kaza centre as "Premedi" in Ergiri sanjak of Yanya Vilayet till 1912. During the Albanian Revolt of 1912 Përmet was freed by the Ottomans by Albanians under the leadership of Menduh Zavalani, Nexhip Bënja, Spiro Bellkameni and  Servet Frashëri on 14 August.

20th century and modern day 

In 1912, during the First Balkan War the population founded a committee that had as its goal the organization of the local resistance with help from government of Vlora and chetas operating across Southern Albania. In a 28 December rally through the town centre people of Permet agreed they must fight where the nation most needed. In February 1913, units of the advancing 3rd Division of the Greek Army entered the town without facing Ottoman resistance, while the resistance of the local population was not sufficient due to small amount of arms. In 1914, Përmet became part of the Autonomous Republic of Northern Epirus, which struggled against annexation of the region to the Albanian state.

During the Greco-Italian War, on December 4, 1940, the town came under the control of the advancing forces of the Greek II Army Corps. Përmet returned to Axis control in April 1941. In May 1944 the National Liberation Movement held in the town the congress, which elected the provisional government of Albania.

In August 2013, demonstrations took place by the local Orthodox community as a result of the confiscation of the Cathedral of the Assumption of the Virgin and the forcible removal of the clergy and of religious artifacts from the temple, by the state authorities. The Cathedral was allegedly not fully returned to the Orthodox Autocephalous Church of Albania after the restoration of Democracy in the country. The incident provoked reactions by the Orthodox Church of Albania and also trigerred diplomatic intervention from Greece.

Demography 

The total population is 10,614 (2011 census). The population of the former municipality at the 2011 census was 5,945.

History 
1930: Përmet had 1,000 houses, 300 shops, was an important regional trade centre and its population was Muslim.

Modern
In Përmet, apart from Muslim and Christian Albanian communities, Greeks and Aromanians are also found in a number of neighbourhoods.

Culture 
Përmet is known for its cuisine, particularly the many different types of jam (reçel) and kompot (komposto), and the production of local wine and raki.

Sports 
Përmet is also home to the football club SK Përmeti and basketball club KB Përmeti.

Notable people 
Laver Bariu, clarinetist.
Stefanaq Pollo, historian.
Adam Doukas, (1790-1860), Greek revolutionary and Minister of War.
Vasileios Ioannidis, Greek theologian and professor.
Antoneta Papapavli, actress.
Odhise Paskali, sculptor People's Artist of Albania.
Turhan Përmeti, politician and former Prime Minister of Albania.
Simon Stefani, politician.
Mentor Xhemali, singer.
Saint Christos the Arvanid, Albanian Saint.
Ilirjan Çaushaj, footballer.
Dhimitër Kacimbra, Albanian politician.
Ervis Kaja, footballer.
Edison Qafa, footballer.
Kamber Ali, 3rd Dedebaba of the Bektashi Order.
Abaz Hilmi, 5th Dedebaba of the Bektashi Order.

See also 
List of mayors of Përmet
Fir of Hotova National Park

Notes

References

Sources

External links 

bashkiapermet.gov.alOfficial Website 

 
Cities in Albania
Aromanian settlements in Albania
Greek communities in Albania
Towns in Albania
Administrative units of Përmet
Municipalities in Gjirokastër County
Labëria